Mshinskoye Boloto Zakaznik is a federal zakaznik, a nature protected area, in the northwest of Russia, located in Gatchinsky and Luzhsky Districts of Leningrad Oblast, in the basin of the Luga River. It was established in 1982 to protect the swampy ecosystems including pine forests. From 1994, it is a Ramsar Wetland.

Geography
Mshinskoye Boloto is located at the divide of the Oredezh River (east) and the Yashchera River (west), both being tributaries of the Luga River. In the center of the area there are Lake Vyalye, Lake Strechno (which are connected with each other) and Lake Mochalishche. The whole area is a wetland and hardly accessible. Swamps occupy about 40% of the area of the zakaznik. Woods occupy 49% of the area, 26% are coniferous forests.

History
In 1972, the area was designated as an important natural landscape. The federal zakaznik was created on August 30, 1982. In 1994, Mshinskoye Boloto Zakaznik, together with the adjacent regional North of Mshinskoye Boloto Zakaznik was classified as a Ramsar wetland (Mshinskaya Wetland).

Fauna
The wetland is a bird sanctuary. Rare species of birds include osprey, golden eagle, white stork, black stork, black-throated loon, whooper swan, Eurasian curlew, Eurasian eagle-owl, and Eurasian bittern.

References 

Geography of Leningrad Oblast
Protected areas of Russia
Protected areas established in 1982
Ramsar sites in Russia
1982 establishments in the Soviet Union